literally means seventh street in Japanese.
 , a numbered east–west street in Heian-kyō, present-day Kyoto, Japan
 Shichijō Station, a train station on the Keihan Main Line in Higashiyama-ku, Kyoto
 , a Japanese kuge family descended from the